Haiat Farag (born February 18, 1987) is an amateur Egyptian freestyle wrestler, who played for the women's middleweight category. Farag represented Egypt at the 2008 Summer Olympics in Beijing, where she competed for the women's 63 kg class. She was quickly pinned in the first preliminary round by American wrestler Randi Miller, at about forty seconds.

References

External links
 NBC 2008 Olympics profile
 

Egyptian female sport wrestlers
1987 births
Living people
Olympic wrestlers of Egypt
Wrestlers at the 2008 Summer Olympics
21st-century Egyptian women